Criss Cross is a Colonial style brick house built about 1690 by George Poindexter in New Kent County, Virginia. It is similar in style to neighboring Foster's Castle. George Poindexter was the immigrant founder of the Poindexters in America.  Originally from Jersey, he settled his family in the Virginia Colony.

It was listed on the National Register of Historic Places in 1973.

References

External links
Criss-Cross, State Route 617 vicinity, New Kent, New Kent County, VA 11 photos, 13 measured drawings, and 5 data pages, at Historic American Buildings Survey
Poindexter Descendants Association - More information on the Poindexter family.

Historic American Buildings Survey in Virginia
Houses completed in 1690
Houses in New Kent County, Virginia
Houses on the National Register of Historic Places in Virginia
National Register of Historic Places in New Kent County, Virginia
1690 establishments in Virginia